Decroix is a surname. Notable people with the surname include:

Emile Decroix (1904–1967), Belgian racing cyclist
Éric Decroix (born 1969), French footballer
Julien Decroix, better known as Soan, (born 1981), French singer-songwriter
Lieselot Decroix (born 1987), Belgian road cyclist
Marjolein Decroix (born 1992), Belgian alpine skier

See also 
Delacroix
Delcroix